Nový Hrozenkov is a market town in Vsetín District in the Zlín Region of the Czech Republic. It has about 2,500 inhabitants.

Notable people
Otto Dov Kulka (1933–2021), Israeli historian
Vítězslav Országh (born 1943), weightlifter

References

Populated places in Vsetín District
Market towns in the Czech Republic
Moravian Wallachia